James O'Donoghue (born 19 June 1990) is an Irish Gaelic footballer who plays for Kerry SFC club Killarney Legion. He is a former player at senior level for the Kerry county team.

Career
Born in Killarney, County Kerry, O'Donoghue's father, Diarmuid, won two All-Ireland medals with the Kerry senior football team under Mick O'Dwyer. He first came to prominence at juvenile and underage levels with the Killarney Legion club, while also enjoying Corn Uí Mhuirí success with St. Brendan's College. O'Donoghue first appeared on the inter-county scene as a member of the Kerry minor football team that won the Munster Minor Championship in 2008. His two seasons with the under-21 team yielded little in terms of success before making his senior team debut during the 2010 National League. O'Donoghue made a combined total of 76 league and championship appearances and was named Footballer of the Year in 2014, having earlier helped Kerry to the All-Ireland Championship title. His other honours include nine Munster Championships and three National League titles. O'Donoghue announced his inter-county retirement in January 2022.

Personal life
O'Donoghue did a Level 7 Sports and Exercise Course at the University of Limerick between 2008 and 2013. He became a Qualified Financial Advisor in Banking and Financial Support Services after doing a course at IOB (a recognised college of University College Dublin) between 2015 and 2018. He worked as a bartender in Dan Linehans Bar between November 2004 and January 2015. He began working as a mortgage advisor for Allied Irish Banks in February 2015.

Career statistics

Honours
St Brendan's College
 Corn Uí Mhuirí: 2008

East Kerry
 Kerry Senior Football Championship: 2022

 Killarney Legion
 East Kerry Senior Football Championship: 2019

Kerry
 All-Ireland Senior Football Championship: 2014
 Munster Senior Football Championship: 2010, 2011, 2013, 2014, 2015, 2016, 2017, 2018, 2019
National Football League 2017, 2020, 2021
 Munster Minor Football Championship: 2008

Awards
 All Stars Footballer of the Year: 2014
 All Stars: 2013, 2014
 The Sunday Game Player of the Year: 2014

References

External link
James O'Donoghue profile at the Terrace Talk website

1990 births
Living people
All Stars Awards winners (football)
Allied Irish Banks people
Gaelic football forwards
Kerry inter-county Gaelic footballers
Killarney Legion Gaelic footballers